Tržič is a small settlement west of Struge in the southern part of the Municipality of Dobrepolje in Slovenia. The area is part of the historical region of Lower Carniola. The municipality is now included in the Central Slovenia Statistical Region.

References

External links
Tržič on Geopedia

Populated places in the Municipality of Dobrepolje